The Wings of the Dove is a 1997 British-American romantic drama film directed by Iain Softley and starring Helena Bonham Carter, Linus Roache, and Alison Elliott. The screenplay by Hossein Amini is based on the 1902 novel of the same name by Henry James. The film was nominated for four Academy Awards and five BAFTAs, recognizing Bonham Carter's performance, the screenplay, the costume design, and the cinematography.

Plot
In 1910 London, Kate Croy (Helena Bonham Carter) lives under the careful watch of her domineering Aunt Maude (Charlotte Rampling). The wealthy Maude has taken the penniless Kate in as her ward, intending to marry her to a rich man and save her from the fate which befell her recently deceased mother when she married Kate's own dissolute father, Lionel (Michael Gambon). Lord Mark (Alex Jennings), a sophisticated aristocrat with a large estate, begins to court Kate with Maude's approval. However, Kate is secretly in love with a young muckraking journalist named Merton Densher (Linus Roache), whom her aunt has forbidden her from pursuing a relationship with because of his humble circumstances. Nonetheless, she has continued to meet with Merton in secret, though he is growing increasingly impatient for her to leave her aunt and marry him.

Aunt Maude confronts Kate about her continuing association with Merton and threatens to withdraw her financial support from Kate and her father. Kate reluctantly breaks with Merton and refuses to meet with him anymore. A few months later, at a dinner party given by her aunt, Kate is introduced to the wealthy American orphan and heiress Milly Theale (Allison Elliot), who is on an extended trip through Europe with her travelling companion Susan Stringham (Elizabeth McGovern). The cynical Kate is captivated by Milly's beauty, vivaciousness and humour, and the two form a strong friendship. Kate and Merton reconcile and resume their secret meetings; one day they run into Milly, and Kate introduces Merton as a family friend. Soon after, Milly invites Kate to accompany her and Susan to Venice.

Before leaving, Lord Mark secretly reveals to Kate that Milly is terminally ill and that although he desires Kate he needs to marry Milly and her fortune to avoid losing his estates. Aware that Milly is indifferent to Lord Mark but is smitten with Merton, Kate invites Merton to Venice and persuades him to show Milly affection in an effort to seduce her. Kate expects that the orphaned and lonely Milly will leave him her fortune after her death.

During Kate's, Milly's, and Merton's excursions through Venice, Kate gradually becomes jealous of Milly's attraction to Merton, so much so that she lures him away one night to have sex. Milly confronts her the next morning, though Kate denies that Merton is her lover. She realises that, if her scheme is to succeed, she must leave Venice without warning Merton. On their own in Venice, Merton's affection for Milly grows and the two form a strong bond, even as her condition worsens. One day Merton spots Lord Mark at a cafe; alarmed, he goes to visit Milly but is denied entry. Susan visits him and Merton realises that Kate has revealed their secret to Lord Mark to sabotage the whole scheme, knowing that Mark would tell Milly as revenge for her rejecting him. Nonetheless, Milly agrees to see Merton and the two share an intimate moment where she forgives him and says that she still loves both him and Kate, despite their actions. A few days later, Milly dies and Merton and Susan attend her funeral.

After Merton returns to London, Kate comes to Merton's flat. She asks why he has not come to see her in the weeks he has been back and finds a letter from Milly's lawyers, informing Merton that Milly did indeed bequeath a sizable portion of her estate to him. Merton tells Kate that he will not take the money, and she must marry him without it if they are to be together. They make love and afterwards Kate agrees, with the condition he tells her that he is not still in love with his memory of Milly. He cannot, and Kate leaves him for good, knowing that her conniving has backfired. Merton returns alone to Venice, while in the background we hear Milly's voice repeating her confident assertion that Merton will be coming into his own, and sooner than he thinks.

Cast
 Helena Bonham Carter as Kate Croy
 Alison Elliott as Milly Theale
 Linus Roache as Merton Densher
 Elizabeth McGovern as Susan Stringham
 Charlotte Rampling as Aunt Maude
 Michael Gambon as Lionel Croy
 Alex Jennings as Lord Mark

Production
Filming for The Wings of the Dove took place over the summer of 1996, with eight weeks spent in London and six in Venice. London exterior locations include Brompton Cemetery on the Fulham Road; Carlton House Terrace in St. James's (Aunt Maud's house); Freemasons' Hall in Great Queen Street (Merton's newspaper office); Kensington Gardens; the National Liberal Club in Whitehall; the Richmond Fellowship; and the Old Royal Naval College in Greenwich. Knebworth House in Hertfordshire stood in for Lord Mark's country estate, and Debenham House in Kensington for his London home. Syon House in London was used for the wedding reception scene early in the film. Shepperton Studios was used for the mock-ups of a platform tunnel and passageways representing both Dover Street and Knightsbridge tube stations.

Locations in Venice include St. Mark's Square and the Palazzo Barbaro.<ref>“The City of Falling Angels, John Berendt, Penguin Books, 2006, pg.147 , </ref> The Palazzo Barbaro was where Henry James wrote the original novel and is believed to have inspired Millie's palazzo as it is described in the book.

Costume designer Sandy Powell sought a clear distinction between the outfits the female characters wear in London and Venice, with the London costumes consisting of "chic outfits with the daring feeling of contemporary high fashion, clothes that herald the start of the more provocative "Twenties" fashion". In Venice, Powell sourced luxuriant, loose fitting gowns in lighter colors, reflecting a more "ethnic, North African look". Powell was inspired by the gowns of the early 20th century designer Fortuny; her goal was to reflect the freedom of the characters during their time in the city.

A notable departure from Henry James’ text is the inclusion of a sex scene late in the film, with Kate and Merton naked on a bed. “We went into that with our eyes open,” Iain Softley said. “We had no qualms. We felt it was essential in indicating the sort of scene it was, and making it relevant and familiar in the most stark way possible."

Release
The film grossed $13,718,385 in the United States and Canada. It grossed £2,142,932 ($3.6 million) in the United Kingdom for a worldwide total of over $17 million.

Critical reception
On Rotten Tomatoes, the film has a rating of 85%, based on 34 reviews, with an average rating of 7.9/10. The website's consensus reads, "The Wings of the Dove patiently explores class divisions in early 20th century Europe through the well-written and beautifully acted travails of star-crossed lovers." On Metacritic, the film holds a score of 73 out of 100, based on 18 reviews, indicating "generally favorable reviews".

In his review in The New York Times, Stephen Holden called the film a "spellbinding screen adaptation [that] succeeds where virtually every other film translation of a James novel has stumbled...This magnificent film conveys an intimation of what values count the most, of what really matters, but it is also far too intelligent and sympathetic to human frailty to spell them out. You feel them most of all in the characters' unbridgeable silences."

Edward Guthmann of the San Francisco Chronicle wrote "The Wings of the Dove was a minor literary work that manages on screen to upstage both Washington Square and The Portrait of a Lady, two superior Henry James novels that came across as stiff and deliberate in recent film translations. This is a breakthrough for Softley, whose earlier films Backbeat and Hackers only hinted at the style and complexity he displays here, and a wonderful showcase for Roache, Elliott and Bonham Carter, who gives her best performance yet."

In Entertainment Weekly, Owen Gleiberman graded the film A and observed it "has a lush yet aching beauty that seems to saturate you as you watch it. I'm not just talking about visual beauty. I'm speaking of dramatic beauty, the exquisite moment-to-moment tension of characters who reveal themselves layer by layer, flowing from thought to feeling and back again, until thought and feeling become drama. Director Iain Softley has made one of the rare movies that evokes not just the essence of a great novel but the experience of it...The Wings of the Dove is, I think, a great film ... that confirms the arrival of major screen talents: director Softley, who works with sublime sensitivity to the intricacies of self-deception; Bonham Carter and Roache, who create a dazzlingly intimate chemistry within the propriety of Jamesian manners; and The Spitfire Grill's Alison Elliott, who, with her beatific charm and Mona Lisa smile, does one of the most difficult things an actress can — she brings goodness itself to life."

David Stratton of Variety stated the film "gives Helena Bonham Carter one of her best opportunities in a while, one which she seizes with relish, looking vibrant and totally convincing in her pivotal role...The Wings of the Dove may be typical of the school of British literary cinema, but Softley's handling of several key elements, including an unusually frank love scene in the later stages, is always inventive. Production values are of the highest standard."

Andrew Johnston, writing in Time Out New York, noted that "Softley and Amini risk making their film seriously anachronistic by emphasizing the plot's pulpish qualities, but the able cast helps make it work." He also observed that "the immaculate production design makes turn-of-the-century London and Venice seem vibrant and real. Wings'' is a masterful and deeply haunting film; it adds genuine relevance to a genre that typically leans toward the static."

Awards and nominations

See also
 List of American films of 1997

References

External links
 
 
 
 
 

1997 films
1990s English-language films
1997 romantic drama films
British romantic drama films
American romantic drama films
Films scored by Edward Shearmur
Films based on works by Henry James
Films based on American novels
Films produced by David Parfitt
Films set in London
Films set in the 1910s
Films set in Venice
Films with screenplays by Hossein Amini
British historical romance films
American historical romance films
Romantic period films
1990s historical romance films
Films directed by Iain Softley
BAFTA winners (films)
1990s American films
1990s British films